"Imaginary Monsters" is an EP by the Canadian rock band The Birthday Massacre, and contains three new tracks, and five remixes. It was released August 9, 2011. The whole album was made available for streaming direct from the band's Myspace on August 4, 2011. Album artwork by Owen Mackinder, the band's keyboardist.

Track listing

Conception
Rainbow of The Birthday Massacre said that the album's sound is a reflection of the bands creative taste, and is about doing fun and colorful things in an aggressive and scary way. The first three tracks on the album are tracks that were not completed in time to make it onto the Pins and Needles record. Imaginary Monsters also includes remixes of tracks from their 2010 album Pins and Needles by Combichrist, SKOLD, Kevvy Mental & Dave Ogilvie, Tweaker, and Assemblage 23. About the title of the EP, Rainbow stated: "The title was partially inspired by some of the doubts and fears we’ve had to face and overcome throughout the past year".

References

2011 EPs
The Birthday Massacre albums